Giulio Magnani  (June 1505 – 25 September 1565) was a Roman Catholic prelate who served as Bishop of Calvi Risorta (1560–1565).

Biography
Giulio Magnani was born in Piacenza in June 1505. He entered in the Order of Friars Minor Conventual. He earned a Doctorate of Sacred Theology and in 1549 became Attorney General of his order. In 1551 he was appointed Vicar general of the Friars Minor Conventual and in Genoa in 1553 he was elected  Minister General, an office he maintained up to 1559.

Giulio Magnani participated to Council of Trent, including also the sessions in the years 1545–1547 as delegate of his order. He was remembered as a gentle, erudite and austere man.

On 17 July 1560, he was appointed by Pope Pius IV as Bishop of Calvi Risorta. The episcopal consecration followed on 28 July 1560 in the Basilica of the Santi Apostoli in Rome by the hands of Pompeo Zambeccari.

Since 1560, he served as Bishop of Calvi Risorta until his death occurred in Teano on 25 September 1565. He was buried in the church of San Francesco in Teano.

References 

16th-century Italian Roman Catholic bishops
1505 births
1565 deaths
Bishops appointed by Pope Pius IV
Conventual Franciscan bishops
Ministers General of the Order of Friars Minor Conventual
Participants in the Council of Trent
People from Piacenza